Mária Šofranko (born 30 June 1970 in Krompachy) is a Slovak teacher, activist and politician. Since 2020, she has served as a Member of the National Council for the Ordinary People and Independent Personalities movement.

Šofranko studied Pedagogy at the University of Prešov and the Catholic University in Ružomberok. She worked as a teacher and later headmistress at the elementary school in Domaňovce. In addition, she was in charge of the local culture centre in Smižany.

When elected MP, her swearing in was delayed to 12 May, due to health reasons.

Šofranko is divorced, has one daughter. Her daughter is the partner of the hockey player Adam Jánošík.

References 

1970 births
Living people
OĽaNO politicians
Members of the National Council (Slovakia) 2020-present
Female members of the National Council (Slovakia)